Meek Warrior is the second album by Akron/Family, released in 2006. The cover art uses a picture of the Crab Nebula. The title is possibly a reference to the concept of warriorship in the Shambhala tradition: the first step on the warrior's path is to become meek.

Track listing
"Blessing Force" – 9:29
"Gone Beyond" – 3:22
"Meek Warrior" – 2:17
"No Space in This Realm" – 5:12
"Lightning Bolt of Compassion" – 4:10
"The Rider (Dolphin Song)" – 7:20
"Love and Space" – 3:37

References 

2006 albums
Akron/Family albums
Young God Records albums
Albums produced by Michael Gira